Osvaldo Noé Miranda (born 24 June 1984 in Luján de Cuyo, Mendoza) is an Argentine football striker.

Career
Miranda started his career in 2002 at Luján de Cuyo in the 3rd division interior. In 2003, he joined Godoy Cruz in the 2nd division.

In 2004, he got his chance to play in the Primera, with Almagro he excelled in his first season, finishing as the  2nd top scorer in the Apertura 2004 tournaments. One of the highlights of his time at Almagro was scoring in a 2-0 win over Club Atlético River Plate at the Monumental. Despite his goals Almagro were relegated at the end of the 2004-2005 season.

Miranda had short spells with Racing Club and Independiente before returning to Mendoza Province to rejoin Godoy Cruz in 2006. After Godoy Cruz were relegated from the Primera at the end of the 2006-2007 season Miranda moved to Gimnasia y Esgrima de Jujuy.

On February 7, 2008, Miranda signed a three-year contract with Romanian football team FC Dinamo Bucureşti. The reported transfer fee is $1.5 million. On 26 August 2010 Miranda signed with Astra Ploieşti.

In June 2019, Miranda joined Deportivo Maipú. He left the club at the end of the year.

References

External links
 Profile on Astra Ploieşti website
 
 
 Osvaldo Miranda at BDFA.com.ar 
 Futbol XXI profile at Fútbol XXI  
 Interview with Osvaldo Miranda in Gazeta Sporturilor

Argentine footballers
Argentine expatriate footballers
Association football forwards
Club Almagro players
Godoy Cruz Antonio Tomba footballers
Racing Club de Avellaneda footballers
Club Atlético Independiente footballers
Gimnasia y Esgrima de Jujuy footballers
Argentinos Juniors footballers
Sportivo Belgrano footballers
Ferro Carril Oeste footballers
Central Córdoba de Santiago del Estero footballers
Club Atlético Los Andes footballers
Crucero del Norte footballers
Estudiantes de Río Cuarto footballers
Deportivo Maipú players
Argentine Primera División players
Primera Nacional players
Torneo Federal A players
Sportspeople from Mendoza Province
1984 births
Living people
Expatriate footballers in Romania
Liga I players
FC Dinamo București players
FC Astra Giurgiu players